The 3rd Annual Tony Awards were held on April 24, 1949, at the Waldorf-Astoria Grand Ballroom in New York City, and broadcast on radio station WOR and the Mutual Network. The Masters of Ceremonies were Brock Pemberton and James Sauter.

Ceremony
The silver Tony medallion, designed by Herman Rosse, was awarded for the first time. The face of the medallion portrayed an adaptation of the comedy and tragedy masks and the reverse side had a relief profile of Antoinette Perry.

Performers: Yvonne Adair, Anne Renee Anderson, Carol Channing, Alfred Drake, Bill Eythe, Nanette Fabray, Jane Froman, Lisa Kirk, Mary McCarty, Lucy Monroe, Gene Nelson, Lanny Ross, Lee Stacy, Lawrence Tibbett, Betty Jane Watson, and Paul Winchell.

The American Theatre Wing "emphasized that it avoids any 'firsts' or 'bests' and presents the prizes for a 'notable contributuion to the current season'.... Anything that enlivens the theatre may win a 'Tony'". South Pacific, which had won the Critics' Circle Award, was not eligible for these Tony Awards, which were confined to productions opening up to March 1, 1949. It was eligible for the following year.

Award winners
Note: nominees not shown

Production

Performance

Craft

Multiple nominations and awards

The following productions received multiple awards.

6 wins: Death of a Salesman  
5 wins: Kiss Me, Kate 
2 wins: Anne of the Thousand Days

References

External links
Official site
Infoplease listing, 1949

Tony Awards ceremonies
1949 in theatre
1949 awards
1949 in the United States
1949 in New York City
April 1949 events in the United States